Vincent Simon Lo-Shing (born 28 September 1983) is a soccer player from Tahiti currently playing for A.S. Pirae and for the Tahiti national football team. He made his debut for the national team on 2004 against Cook Islands.

At the 2013 FIFA Confederations Cup Simon failed a drug test for tuaminoheptane doping. He was suspended until 7 February 2014.

International goals

Honours

Domestic
Tahiti First Division:
 Winner (1): 2012

International
OFC Nations Cup:
 Winner (1): 2012

International career statistics

References

External links

1983 births
Living people
French Polynesian footballers
Tahiti international footballers
French Polynesian people of Chinese descent
Sportspeople of Chinese descent
2004 OFC Nations Cup players
2012 OFC Nations Cup players
2013 FIFA Confederations Cup players
2016 OFC Nations Cup players
Doping cases in association football
Association football fullbacks